This is a list of Members of Parliament (MPs) elected to the House of Representatives of Trinidad and Tobago by Tobagonian constituencies to represent them nationally in the Parliament of Trinidad and Tobago. There are currently two constituencies that represent the autonomous ward of Tobago in the House of Representatives: Tobago East and Tobago West.

From the first general elections held in the colony in 1925 till independence, the whole island of Tobago was represented in the Legislative Council of Trinidad and Tobago with one constituency named Tobago. The two  constituencies of Tobago East and Tobago West were created by the Boundaries Commission prior to the 1961 Trinidad and Tobago general election before independence from the United Kingdom in 1962. Although Tobago did not have a large enough voting population to justify the division, the commission determined that it would be best represented by two Members of Parliament. This is reflected in Part IV, section 70 of the 1976 Constitution which requires Tobago to have at least two constituencies.

The list is sorted by the name of the MP.

Current MPs

Former MPs

Tobago East

Tobago West

References

 
MPs for constituencies in Tobago